Catalina Labake (born 5 June 1998) is an Argentinian field hockey player.

Hockey career 
In 2018, Labake took part of the team that won the 2018 South American Games.

References

1998 births
Living people
Las Leonas players
Argentine female field hockey players
Field hockey players from Buenos Aires
South American Games medalists in field hockey
South American Games gold medalists for Argentina
21st-century Argentine women